Palaeoludus is an extinct genus of caddisflies in the family Dysoneuridae. It contains only one species, Palaeoludus popovi. The genus is known from the lower Cretaceous of southern England.

References

Integripalpia
Early Cretaceous insects
†
Prehistoric insect genera
†
Fossils of England